Why Has Bodhi-Dharma Left for the East? (달마가 동쪽으로 간 까닭은? – Dalmaga dongjjok-euro gan ggadakeun?) (1989) is a South Korean film written, produced and directed by Bae Yong-kyun, a professor at Dongguk University in Seoul. Known principally as a painter, Bae spent seven years making this film with one camera and editing it by hand. The film was screened in the Un Certain Regard section at the 1989 Cannes Film Festival. It was the first South Korean film to receive a theater release in the United States. The US distributor Milestone Films premiered the film in New York City on September 24, 1993 and then expanded to over 30 cities.

Plot

A meditative film dealing with Seon Buddhist views on life, Why Has Bodhi-Dharma Left for the East? follows the lives of three Buddhist monks: an orphaned boy, an adult monk and an elderly monk.

This film is largely about two Zen koan: ‘what was my original face before my mother and father were conceived?’ and, ‘(in death) where does the master of my being go?’

The film's title, although not explained literally in the film, is a reference to Bodhidharma, a sixth-century Buddhist monk from India who transmitted Zen to China. The question "Why has Bodhi-Dharma left for the east" is echoed by the young boy's question, "Why have we all left the world?" The entire film can be seen as an answer to that question, so that the film itself becomes a koan.

The three main protagonists are: Hae-jin, an orphan boy; Ki-bong, a young monk and; Hye-gok, a Zen master.

Hae-jin injures a bird while bathing. Its mate does not leave the bird but stays around, as if to see what becomes of its mate. Hae-jin takes the injured bird away to heal it, but it dies later in the film.

The film then cuts to a scene in which an ox breaks through a confining fence and escapes into the forest. The ox represents Ki-bong's need to escape as well as his own blind passions. The ox, like the young man, escapes its confinement, but isn't truly free. It seems free, but really is still subject to its own desires. The young man also escapes the confinement of the world, but is still plagued by his own blind passions. The ox can also be seen as representing the blind passions of the young boy, escaping the walls of his humanity and running amok.

The abbot instructs a young monk (Ki-bong) to assist a Zen master living alone in the mountains. The young monk has renounced his life of hardship in search of peace and perfection.

The Zen master is a recluse, living in a monastery on a high mountain and has realised the vanity of knowledge. The old master mainly tries to communicate his way through the use of hwadu, or Zen riddles with no absolute answers. The first hwadu is "What was my original face before my father and mother were conceived?" The second is "When the moon takes over in your heart (that is, in enlightenment or death), where does the master of my being go?" He instructs the young monk to "hold the koan between his teeth" and solve them. In solving the koans, the old master tells the young monk that he will find an unshakeable peace.

The young monk takes leave of the old monk and goes to town, where he buys medicine for the old man with alms from begging. He also visits his own blind mother, who is having a hard time tending to herself. The young monk returns to the monastery, disillusioned and appalled at his own selfishness in renouncing his destiny, which was to serve his mother and family.

He returns to the old monk and communicates his desire to go back to human society, embrace the filth of humanity. He is severely reprimanded by old the monk, however he does not prevent him from leaving. The young monk leaves the monastery to return to his old life, but is caught in a flash flood and nearly drowns. He is found by Hae-jin and rescued by his master.

When the young monk regains consciousness, he is informed by the boy that his master had been in meditation for quite a while and is severely ill. Ki-bong realises that the master has traded his own life to save him. Deeply moved, he visits the old master, who extracts a promise from Ki-bong to perform his last rites as the old man wishes. His wish is for his body to be burned on top of the hill so that he can return to his original place.

News of a festival on the approaching full-moon day reaches Ki-bong, who wishes to attend it with the boy. Hye-gok, apparently feeling better, gives them leave. He also asks them to bring enough paraffin for him on their way back.

At the festival, Ki-bong and Hae-jin watch the enthralling dance, while it is made known that the dancer is none other than the old monk himself in another form. On a bright full-moon night, Hae-jin and Ki-bong make their way back. Upon returning to the monastery, they  discover that the old man is dead.

True to his promise, with the true meaning and meaninglessness of death, possession, desire and vanity dawning on him with every passing instant, Ki-bong places the corpse in a wooden chest and slowly starts a difficult trek up the hillside. He carries the chest on a firewood pack – presumably the same pack the young monk had used at the beginning of the film to haul firewood – to the monastery. The meaning here is that in death, the body is no different from firewood. This idea is said earlier by the old man when he told the little boy that the boy's extracted tooth is no different from a pebble in the road.

By nightfall, the young monk reaches the burial ground. He tries to light the pyre, but there is a light drizzle and he can't get it started. He suddenly remembers his master's words about the paraffin, so he goes back to the monastery to collect it. He then returns to the burial ground and sets fire to the coffin. He spends the night by the side of the burning body, tortured by his feelings and coming to the full realisation of death.

Looking around the burning body, the ox and the young boy appear. Both seem transfixed by the blaze. Even the blind passions and foolishness of youth are subdued in death.

In the morning, after the funeral pyre has burned down, the young monk is seen kneeling and sifting his fingers through the ashes. In this scene, the young monk is fully encountering the true realisation of death. He seems to be looking for something in the ashes and finds the last few remaining bones of his former master. Presumably, these few small bones are the “master” of the old man's being. They are what is left after everything else is burned away. They are death. The young monk collects these bones and grinds them to powder with a stone. He then walks through the forest, scattering the powdered bones over water, earth, trees and plants.

When the young monk scatters the old man's powdered bones, he returns the old man to his original place, as the master had said must happen. The original place is everywhere, just as his original face is everything. With this realisation, the young monk finally solves the koans and attains the unshakeable peace the master had spoken about. He then returns to the monastery. Seeking out Hae-jin, he entrusts the boy with the master's few remaining possessions. He then takes his leave.

In the final sequence, we see the boy coming of age. In a play scene, the young boy re-enacts the previous night's event by burning the old man's few personal belongings. He does in miniature what the young monk had done the night before. In this act, the boy remembers the old man's teachings and comes to understand the nature of impermanence. He wakes up the next day and goes to the stream to collect water. As usual, the dead bird's companion chirps to distract him (the chirping bird represents the sound of death), but this time the boy does not even notice it. Understanding impermanence, his education is complete. He enters the master's room and closes it after him. An old master has died and a new one has taken his place. The bird flies away, liberated. The wandering ox (which had always been shown before in shadow) returns with a man (possibly Ki-bong), walking beside him in sunlight. It, too, has found peace. Rather than having to face the choice between confinement or escape, the blind passions now walk alongside the human. Both the human and the passions find their true place.

Awards
 1989 Locarno International Film Festival, the Golden Leopard (Best Film) and Prize of the Ecumenical Jury

See also
Korean Buddhism

Notes

Bibliography

External links

 

1989 films
1989 drama films
South Korean drama films
1980s Korean-language films
Films about Buddhism
Golden Leopard winners
Films directed by Bae Yong-kyun